Bamidele, meaning "Follow me home" in the Yoruba language, is a given name, sometimes shortened to Dele. Notable people with this name include:

Bamidele Abiodun (born 1966), Nigerian businesswoman, philanthropist, wife of Dapo Abiodun, governor of Ogun State, Nigeria
Bamidele Mathew Aiyenugba (born 1983), Nigerian footballer
James Bamidele Oluwafemi Alabi (born 1994), English footballer
Bamidele Ali (born 1976), former gridiron football defensive end
Bamidele Alli (born 1996), English professional footballer
Bamidele Aturu (1964–2014), Nigerian Lawyer and human rights activist
Biyi Bamidele (born 1967), Nigerian novelist, playwright, and filmmaker
Daniel Bamidele (1949–1986), a Nigerian army officer who was executed by the government of Major General Ibrahim Babangida
Michael Opeyemi Bamidele (born 1963), Nigerian Lawyer, human right activist, politician, and member of the National Assembly
Tunde Bamidele (1953–1997), Nigeria football Defender
Bamidele A. Ojo (born 1960), Nigerian and American political scientist, author, professor of political science, and international studies
Johnson Bamidele Olawumi, Major General of the Nigerian army and former Director-General of the National Youth Service Corps
Bamidele Olumilua (1940–2020), a Nigerian politician who was the elected Governor of Ondo State, Nigeria
Michael Bamidele Otiko (1934–1999), the first director of naval education in Nigeria, and later was Governor of Ondo State, Nigeria
Olanrewaju Olusegun Mark Bamidele Oyebanjo (born 1990), professional footballer
Olusola Bamidele Oyewole (born 1955), vice-chancellor of Federal University of Agriculture, Abeokuta
Bamidele Yusuf (born 2001), Nigerian footballer

See also
Dele (name)